Mimiirose (stylized in lower case as mimiirose) is a South Korean girl group formed by Yes Im Entertainment. The group is composed of five members: Han Ye-won, Yoon Ji-a, Seo Yun-ju, Inn Hyo-ri and Choi Yeon-jae. They officially made their debut on September 16, 2022 with their debut single album Awesome with the lead single, Rose.

Name
The group's name, 'mimiirose' is a compound word of mimiimii, meaning beauty and rose. mimiirose means blooming like a gorgeous rose by comparing the petals surrounded by layers to inner and outer beauty.

History

Pre-debut activities
Some members have previously been involved in the entertainment industry prior to joining the group. Yoon Ji-a was a contestant on the reality survival show Girls Planet 999, she was eliminated in episode 8, ranking K11, unable to debut into the final debut lineup. Seo Yun-ju was a former A Team Entertainment trainee and was originally a member of BugAboo, but she left the group before the group officially debuted. After her departure of the group, she became a contestant on My Teenage Girl. but was eliminated in Episode 3.

2022: Introduction and debut with Awesome
On July 10, 2022, Yoon Ji-a announced through her personal Instagram that she would make her debut as a member of Yes Im's upcoming girl group Mimiirose. Mimiirose is the first group to debut under the company, which was formed by Im Chang-jung.

The group made their first public appearance in July 2022 at Im Chang-jung's concert, the CEO of Yes Im Entertainment. On August 24, 2022 Im Chang-jung shared the group were scheduled to debut 2-3 years prior, but was postponed indefinitely due to the COVID-19 pandemic.

The group officially debuted on September 16, 2022, with their debut single album Awesome with the lead single Rose. On the same day, they held their debut showcase which was broadcast on SBS M.

Members

 Inn Hyo-ri
 Choi Yeon-jae – leader
 Han Ye-won
 Yoon Ji-a
 Seo Yun-ju

Discography

Single albums

Singles

References

K-pop music groups
South Korean girl groups
Musical groups established in 2022
South Korean pop music groups
2022 establishments in South Korea